Novemberkåsan is one of Sweden's oldest and biggest motorcycle events. It has been held since 1915.

Throughout the years the contest has evolved to extreme enduro character, the competition includes both day and night stages which are driven in terrain and paths.

The trophy is given to the driver who has won the competition three times.

References

Novemberkåsan 
Novemberkåsan throughout the years 
The event at SVT's open archive 

Motorsport competitions in Sweden
Recurring sporting events established in 1915
1915 establishments in Sweden
November sporting events